AS Police is a football club in Benin, playing in the town of Porto-Novo. They play in the Beninese first division, the Benin Premier League.

Stadium
Currently the team plays at the 6000 capacity Stade Cotonou II.

League participations
 Benin Premier League: 2012–
 Benin Second Division: ?-2012

References

External links
Soccerway
Soccervista

Football clubs in Benin
Sport in Porto-Novo
Police association football clubs